The Lepidoptera of Moldova consist of both the butterflies and moths recorded from the Moldova.

Butterflies

Hesperiidae
Erynnis tages (Linnaeus, 1758)
Carcharodus alceae (Esper, 1780)
Carcharodus lavatherae Esper, 1783
Carcharodus floccifera (Zeller, 1847)
Hesperia comma (Linnaeus, 1758)
Pyrgus carthami (Hübner, [1813])
Pyrgus sidae (Esper, 1784)
Pyrgus malvae (Linnaeus, 1758)

Lycaenidae
Aricia agestis (Denis & Schiffermüller, 1775)
Callophrys rubi (Linnaeus, 1758)
Celastrina argiolus (Linnaeus, 1758)
Cupido argiades (Pallas, 1771)
Cupido minimus (Fuessly, 1775)
Cyaniris semiargus (Rottemburg, 1775)
Glaucopsyche alexis Poda, 1761
Lycaena dispar (Haworth, 1802)
Lycaena phlaeas (Linnaeus, 1761)
Lysandra bellargus (Rottemburg, 1775)
Lysandra coridon (Poda, 1761)
Neozephyrus quercus (Linnaeus, 1758)
Phengaris arion (Linnaeus, 1758)
Plebejus argus (Linnaeus, 1758)
Plebejus argyrognomon (Bergsträsser, 1779)
Plebejus idas (Linnaeus, 1761)
Polyommatus amandus (Schneider, 1792)
Polyommatus daphnis (Denis & Schiffermüller, 1775)
Polyommatus icarus (Rottemburg, 1775)
Satyrium acaciae (Fabricius, 1787)
Satyrium ilicis (Esper, 1779)
Satyrium pruni (Linnaeus, 1758)
Satyrium spini (Schiffermüller, 1775)
Satyrium w-album (Knoch, 1782)
Thecla betulae (Linnaeus, 1758)
Tomares nogelii (Herrich-Schäffer, 1851)

Nymphalidae
Aglais io (Linnaeus, 1758)
Aglais urticae (Linnaeus, 1758)
Apatura ilia ([Denis and Schiffermüller], 1775)
Apatura metis Freyer, 1829
Aphantopus hyperantus (Linnaeus, 1758)
Araschnia levana (Linnaeus, 1758)
Argynnis pandora Denis & Schiffermüller, 1775
Argynnis paphia (Linnaeus, 1758)
Boloria aquilonaris Stichel, 1908
Boloria dia Linnaeus, 1767
Coenonympha arcania Linnaeus, 1761
Coenonympha glycerion Borkhausen, 1788
Coenonympha pamphilus (Linnaeus, 1758)
Euphydryas maturna (Linnaeus, 1758)
Hyponephele lycaon Rottemburg, 1775
Issoria lathonia (Linnaeus, 1758)
Lasiommata maera (Linnaeus, 1758)
Limenitis camilla (Linnaeus, 1764)
Melanargia galathea (Linnaeus, 1758)
Melitaea athalia (Rottemburg, 1775)
Melitaea cinxia (Linnaeus, 1758)
Melitaea diamina (Lang, 1789)
Melitaea phoebe Denis & Schiffermüller, 1775
Minois dryas Scopoli, 1763
Neptis sappho Pallas, 1771
Nymphalis polychloros (Linnaeus, 1758)
Nymphalis xanthomelas (Denis & Schiffermüller, 1775)
Pararge aegeria (Linnaeus, 1758)
Polygonia c-album (Linnaeus, 1758)
Speyeria aglaja (Linnaeus, 1758)
Vanessa atalanta (Linnaeus, 1758)
Vanessa cardui (Linnaeus, 1758)

Papilionidae
Iphiclides podalirius (Linnaeus, 1758)
Papilio machaon  Linnaeus, 1758
Parnassius mnemosyne (Linnaeus, 1758)
Zerynthia polyxena (Denis & Schiffermüller, 1775)

Pieridae
Anthocharis cardamines (Linnaeus, 1758)
Colias chrysotheme Esper, 1781
Colias croceus (Geoffroy, 1785)
Colias erate (Esper, 1805)
Colias hyale (Linnaeus, 1758)
Euchloe ausonia (Hubner, 1805)
Leptidea sinapis (Linnaeus, 1758)
Leptidea morsei (Fenton, 1881)
Pieris brassicae (Linnaeus, 1758)
Pontia chloridice (Hübner, 1813)
Pontia daplidice (Linnaeus, 1758)
Pieris napi (Linnaeus, 1758)
Pieris rapae (Linnaeus, 1758)

Riodinidae
Hamearis lucina (Linnaeus, 1758)

Moths

Adelidae
Adela reaumurella (Linnaeus, 1758)
Cauchas fibulella (Denis & Schiffermuller, 1775)
Nematopogon pilella (Denis & Schiffermuller, 1775)

Alucitidae
Alucita desmodactyla Zeller, 1847

Blastobasidae
Blastobasis phycidella (Zeller, 1839)

Chimabachidae
Dasystoma salicella (Hübner, 1796)
Diurnea fagella (Denis & Schiffermuller, 1775)
Diurnea lipsiella (Denis & Schiffermuller, 1775)

Cosmopterigidae
Cosmopterix zieglerella (Hübner, 1810)
Eteobalea intermediella (Riedl, 1966)
Eteobalea tririvella (Staudinger, 1870)
Limnaecia phragmitella Stainton, 1851
Pancalia leuwenhoekella (Linnaeus, 1761)
Pyroderces argyrogrammos (Zeller, 1847)
Pyroderces caesaris Gozmany, 1957
Sorhagenia rhamniella (Zeller, 1839)

Crambidae
Agriphila inquinatella (Denis & Schiffermuller, 1775)
Agriphila tristella (Denis & Schiffermuller, 1775)
Anania fuscalis (Denis & Schiffermuller, 1775)
Anania hortulata (Linnaeus, 1758)
Chrysocrambus craterella (Scopoli, 1763)
Chrysoteuchia culmella (Linnaeus, 1758)
Crambus lathoniellus (Zincken, 1817)
Crambus perlella (Scopoli, 1763)
Crambus pratella (Linnaeus, 1758)
Ecpyrrhorrhoe rubiginalis (Hübner, 1796)
Eurrhypis cacuminalis (Eversmann, 1843)
Evergestis aenealis (Denis & Schiffermuller, 1775)
Evergestis extimalis (Scopoli, 1763)
Evergestis forficalis (Linnaeus, 1758)
Evergestis frumentalis (Linnaeus, 1761)
Evergestis limbata (Linnaeus, 1767)
Evergestis pallidata (Hufnagel, 1767)
Evergestis politalis (Denis & Schiffermuller, 1775)
Evergestis sophialis (Fabricius, 1787)
Loxostege sticticalis (Linnaeus, 1761)
Loxostege virescalis (Guenee, 1854)
Nomophila noctuella (Denis & Schiffermuller, 1775)
Nymphula nitidulata (Hufnagel, 1767)
Ostrinia nubilalis (Hübner, 1796)
Paratalanta hyalinalis (Hübner, 1796)
Paratalanta pandalis (Hübner, 1825)
Pyrausta aurata (Scopoli, 1763)
Pyrausta despicata (Scopoli, 1763)
Pyrausta falcatalis Guenee, 1854
Pyrausta purpuralis (Linnaeus, 1758)
Udea decrepitalis (Herrich-Schäffer, 1848)
Udea hamalis (Thunberg, 1788)
Udea prunalis (Denis & Schiffermuller, 1775)

Elachistidae
Agonopterix alstromeriana (Clerck, 1759)
Agonopterix heracliana (Linnaeus, 1758)
Agonopterix kaekeritziana (Linnaeus, 1767)
Agonopterix ocellana (Fabricius, 1775)
Depressaria albipunctella (Denis & Schiffermuller, 1775)
Depressaria dictamnella (Treitschke, 1835)
Semioscopis steinkellneriana (Denis & Schiffermuller, 1775)
Semioscopis strigulana (Denis & Schiffermuller, 1775)

Epermeniidae
Ochromolopis zagulajevi Budashkin & Satshkov, 1991

Erebidae
Amata kruegeri (Ragusa, 1904)
Amata phegea (Linnaeus, 1758)
Arctia caja (Linnaeus, 1758)
Arctia festiva (Hufnagel, 1766)
Arctia villica (Linnaeus, 1758)
Arytrura musculus (Menetries, 1859)
Atolmis rubricollis (Linnaeus, 1758)
Autophila dilucida (Hübner, 1808)
Callimorpha dominula (Linnaeus, 1758)
Calymma communimacula (Denis & Schiffermuller, 1775)
Calyptra thalictri (Borkhausen, 1790)
Catephia alchymista (Denis & Schiffermuller, 1775)
Catocala conversa (Esper, 1783)
Catocala dilecta (Hübner, 1808)
Catocala disjuncta (Geyer, 1828)
Catocala diversa (Geyer, 1828)
Catocala electa (Vieweg, 1790)
Catocala elocata (Esper, 1787)
Catocala fraxini (Linnaeus, 1758)
Catocala fulminea (Scopoli, 1763)
Catocala hymenaea (Denis & Schiffermuller, 1775)
Catocala nupta (Linnaeus, 1767)
Catocala nymphagoga (Esper, 1787)
Catocala promissa (Denis & Schiffermuller, 1775)
Catocala puerpera (Giorna, 1791)
Catocala sponsa (Linnaeus, 1767)
Colobochyla salicalis (Denis & Schiffermuller, 1775)
Cybosia mesomella (Linnaeus, 1758)
Diacrisia sannio (Linnaeus, 1758)
Diaphora mendica (Clerck, 1759)
Drasteria cailino (Lefebvre, 1827)
Dysauxes ancilla (Linnaeus, 1767)
Dysgonia algira (Linnaeus, 1767)
Eilema complana (Linnaeus, 1758)
Eilema depressa (Esper, 1787)
Eilema griseola (Hübner, 1803)
Eilema lurideola (Zincken, 1817)
Eilema lutarella (Linnaeus, 1758)
Eilema sororcula (Hufnagel, 1766)
Eublemma amoena (Hübner, 1803)
Eublemma minutata (Fabricius, 1794)
Eublemma ostrina (Hübner, 1808)
Eublemma polygramma (Duponchel, 1842)
Eublemma purpurina (Denis & Schiffermuller, 1775)
Euclidia mi (Clerck, 1759)
Euclidia glyphica (Linnaeus, 1758)
Euclidia triquetra (Denis & Schiffermuller, 1775)
Euplagia quadripunctaria (Poda, 1761)
Euproctis chrysorrhoea (Linnaeus, 1758)
Euproctis similis (Fuessly, 1775)
Grammodes stolida (Fabricius, 1775)
Herminia grisealis (Denis & Schiffermuller, 1775)
Herminia tarsicrinalis (Knoch, 1782)
Herminia tarsipennalis (Treitschke, 1835)
Hypena crassalis (Fabricius, 1787)
Hypena lividalis (Hübner, 1796)
Hypena palpalis (Hübner, 1796)
Hypena proboscidalis (Linnaeus, 1758)
Hypena rostralis (Linnaeus, 1758)
Hypenodes humidalis Doubleday, 1850
Hyphantria cunea (Drury, 1773)
Hyphoraia aulica (Linnaeus, 1758)
Idia calvaria (Denis & Schiffermuller, 1775)
Laspeyria flexula (Denis & Schiffermuller, 1775)
Lithosia quadra (Linnaeus, 1758)
Lygephila craccae (Denis & Schiffermuller, 1775)
Lygephila lusoria (Linnaeus, 1758)
Lygephila pastinum (Treitschke, 1826)
Lygephila procax (Hübner, 1813)
Lygephila viciae (Hübner, 1822)
Lymantria dispar (Linnaeus, 1758)
Lymantria monacha (Linnaeus, 1758)
Macrochilo cribrumalis (Hübner, 1793)
Miltochrista miniata (Forster, 1771)
Minucia lunaris (Denis & Schiffermuller, 1775)
Ocnogyna parasita (Hübner, 1790)
Orectis proboscidata (Herrich-Schäffer, 1851)
Orgyia dubia (Tauscher, 1806)
Paracolax tristalis (Fabricius, 1794)
Pechipogo plumigeralis Hübner, 1825
Pechipogo strigilata (Linnaeus, 1758)
Pericallia matronula (Linnaeus, 1758)
Phragmatobia fuliginosa (Linnaeus, 1758)
Phragmatobia luctifera (Denis & Schiffermuller, 1775)
Phytometra viridaria (Clerck, 1759)
Polypogon gryphalis (Herrich-Schäffer, 1851)
Polypogon tentacularia (Linnaeus, 1758)
Raparna conicephala (Staudinger, 1870)
Rhyparia purpurata (Linnaeus, 1758)
Rivula sericealis (Scopoli, 1763)
Schrankia costaestrigalis (Stephens, 1834)
Schrankia taenialis (Hübner, 1809)
Scoliopteryx libatrix (Linnaeus, 1758)
Simplicia rectalis (Eversmann, 1842)
Spilosoma lubricipeda (Linnaeus, 1758)
Spilosoma lutea (Hufnagel, 1766)
Spilosoma urticae (Esper, 1789)
Trisateles emortualis (Denis & Schiffermuller, 1775)
Tyria jacobaeae (Linnaeus, 1758)
Utetheisa pulchella (Linnaeus, 1758)
Zanclognatha lunalis (Scopoli, 1763)
Zanclognatha zelleralis (Wocke, 1850)
Zekelita antiqualis (Hübner, 1809)

Euteliidae
Eutelia adulatrix (Hübner, 1813)

Gelechiidae
Neofriseria kuznetzovae Bidzilya, 2002

Geometridae
Alsophila aceraria (Denis & Schiffermuller, 1775)
Alsophila aescularia (Denis & Schiffermuller, 1775)
Anticlea derivata (Denis & Schiffermuller, 1775)
Aplocera plagiata (Linnaeus, 1758)
Asthena albulata (Hufnagel, 1767)
Asthena anseraria (Herrich-Schäffer, 1855)
Boudinotiana puella (Esper, 1787)
Camptogramma bilineata (Linnaeus, 1758)
Cataclysme riguata (Hübner, 1813)
Catarhoe cuculata (Hufnagel, 1767)
Catarhoe rubidata (Denis & Schiffermuller, 1775)
Chlorissa viridata (Linnaeus, 1758)
Chloroclysta siterata (Hufnagel, 1767)
Cidaria fulvata (Forster, 1771)
Coenocalpe lapidata (Hübner, 1809)
Colostygia pectinataria (Knoch, 1781)
Comibaena bajularia (Denis & Schiffermuller, 1775)
Cosmorhoe ocellata (Linnaeus, 1758)
Costaconvexa polygrammata (Borkhausen, 1794)
Cyclophora punctaria (Linnaeus, 1758)
Cyclophora annularia (Fabricius, 1775)
Dysstroma citrata (Linnaeus, 1761)
Earophila badiata (Denis & Schiffermuller, 1775)
Electrophaes corylata (Thunberg, 1792)
Epirrhoe galiata (Denis & Schiffermuller, 1775)
Epirrhoe molluginata (Hübner, 1813)
Epirrhoe rivata (Hübner, 1813)
Epirrhoe tristata (Linnaeus, 1758)
Epirrita dilutata (Denis & Schiffermuller, 1775)
Euphyia biangulata (Haworth, 1809)
Euphyia unangulata (Haworth, 1809)
Gandaritis pyraliata (Denis & Schiffermuller, 1775)
Horisme tersata (Denis & Schiffermuller, 1775)
Horisme vitalbata (Denis & Schiffermuller, 1775)
Hydrelia flammeolaria (Hufnagel, 1767)
Hydria undulata (Linnaeus, 1758)
Idaea degeneraria (Hübner, 1799)
Idaea politaria (Hübner, 1799)
Idaea seriata (Schrank, 1802)
Lithostege coassata (Hübner, 1825)
Lithostege farinata (Hufnagel, 1767)
Lithostege griseata (Denis & Schiffermuller, 1775)
Lobophora halterata (Hufnagel, 1767)
Lythria cruentaria (Hufnagel, 1767)
Lythria purpuraria (Linnaeus, 1758)
Melanthia procellata (Denis & Schiffermuller, 1775)
Mesoleuca albicillata (Linnaeus, 1758)
Minoa murinata (Scopoli, 1763)
Nothocasis sertata (Hübner, 1817)
Nycterosea obstipata (Fabricius, 1794)
Odezia atrata (Linnaeus, 1758)
Operophtera brumata (Linnaeus, 1758)
Pelurga comitata (Linnaeus, 1758)
Phibalapteryx virgata (Hufnagel, 1767)
Philereme transversata (Hufnagel, 1767)
Philereme vetulata (Denis & Schiffermuller, 1775)
Plemyria rubiginata (Denis & Schiffermuller, 1775)
Rhodostrophia vibicaria (Clerck, 1759)
Schistostege nubilaria (Hübner, 1799)
Scopula marginepunctata (Goeze, 1781)
Scopula ornata (Scopoli, 1763)
Scopula tessellaria (Boisduval, 1840)
Scotopteryx bipunctaria (Denis & Schiffermuller, 1775)
Scotopteryx chenopodiata (Linnaeus, 1758)
Scotopteryx moeniata (Scopoli, 1763)
Scotopteryx mucronata (Scopoli, 1763)
Thalera fimbrialis (Scopoli, 1763)
Thera variata (Denis & Schiffermuller, 1775)
Thetidia smaragdaria (Fabricius, 1787)
Timandra comae Schmidt, 1931
Trichopteryx polycommata (Denis & Schiffermuller, 1775)
Xanthorhoe designata (Hufnagel, 1767)
Xanthorhoe ferrugata (Clerck, 1759)
Xanthorhoe fluctuata (Linnaeus, 1758)
Xanthorhoe montanata (Denis & Schiffermuller, 1775)
Xanthorhoe quadrifasiata (Clerck, 1759)
Xanthorhoe spadicearia (Denis & Schiffermuller, 1775)

Gracillariidae
Callisto denticulella (Thunberg, 1794)
Caloptilia fidella (Reutti, 1853)
Caloptilia roscipennella (Hübner, 1796)
Calybites phasianipennella (Hübner, 1813)
Gracillaria syringella (Fabricius, 1794)
Parectopa ononidis (Zeller, 1839)
Parornix anguliferella (Zeller, 1847)
Parornix devoniella (Stainton, 1850)
Parornix finitimella (Zeller, 1850)
Parornix petiolella (Frey, 1863)
Parornix scoticella (Stainton, 1850)
Parornix torquillella (Zeller, 1850)
Phyllonorycter acaciella (Duponchel, 1843)
Phyllonorycter acerifoliella (Zeller, 1839)
Phyllonorycter blancardella (Fabricius, 1781)
Phyllonorycter cerasicolella (Herrich-Schäffer, 1855)
Phyllonorycter coryli (Nicelli, 1851)
Phyllonorycter corylifoliella (Hübner, 1796)
Phyllonorycter emberizaepenella (Bouche, 1834)
Phyllonorycter fraxinella (Zeller, 1846)
Phyllonorycter harrisella (Linnaeus, 1761)
Phyllonorycter insignitella (Zeller, 1846)
Phyllonorycter joannisi (Le Marchand, 1936)
Phyllonorycter klemannella (Fabricius, 1781)
Phyllonorycter messaniella (Zeller, 1846)
Phyllonorycter muelleriella (Zeller, 1839)
Phyllonorycter nicellii (Stainton, 1851)
Phyllonorycter oxyacanthae (Frey, 1856)
Phyllonorycter populifoliella (Treitschke, 1833)
Phyllonorycter pyrifoliella (Gerasimov, 1933)
Phyllonorycter quercifoliella (Zeller, 1839)
Phyllonorycter rajella (Linnaeus, 1758)
Phyllonorycter salictella (Zeller, 1846)
Phyllonorycter sorbi (Frey, 1855)
Phyllonorycter spinicolella (Zeller, 1846)
Phyllonorycter tristrigella (Haworth, 1828)
Sauterina hofmanniella (Schleich, 1867)

Lecithoceridae
Lecithocera nigrana (Duponchel, 1836)
Odites kollarella (O. G. Costa, 1832)

Momphidae
Mompha subbistrigella (Haworth, 1828)

Nepticulidae
Ectoedemia agrimoniae (Frey, 1858)
Ectoedemia arcuatella (Herrich-Schäffer, 1855)
Ectoedemia atricollis (Stainton, 1857)
Ectoedemia caradjai (Groschke, 1944)
Ectoedemia heringi (Toll, 1934)
Ectoedemia subbimaculella (Haworth, 1828)
Simplimorpha promissa (Staudinger, 1871)
Stigmella anomalella (Goeze, 1783)
Stigmella aurella (Fabricius, 1775)
Stigmella basiguttella (Heinemann, 1862)
Stigmella desperatella (Frey, 1856)
Stigmella freyella (Heyden, 1858)
Stigmella hybnerella (Hübner, 1796)
Stigmella lemniscella (Zeller, 1839)
Stigmella minusculella (Herrich-Schäffer, 1855)
Stigmella paradoxa (Frey, 1858)
Stigmella plagicolella (Stainton, 1854)
Stigmella prunetorum (Stainton, 1855)
Stigmella rhamnella (Herrich-Schäffer, 1860)
Stigmella ulmivora (Fologne, 1860)

Noctuidae
Abrostola tripartita (Hufnagel, 1766)
Abrostola triplasia (Linnaeus, 1758)
Acontia lucida (Hufnagel, 1766)
Acontia trabealis (Scopoli, 1763)
Acontia melanura (Tauscher, 1809)
Acontia titania (Esper, 1798)
Acronicta aceris (Linnaeus, 1758)
Acronicta leporina (Linnaeus, 1758)
Acronicta strigosa (Denis & Schiffermuller, 1775)
Acronicta alni (Linnaeus, 1767)
Acronicta cuspis (Hübner, 1813)
Acronicta psi (Linnaeus, 1758)
Acronicta tridens (Denis & Schiffermuller, 1775)
Acronicta auricoma (Denis & Schiffermuller, 1775)
Acronicta cinerea (Hufnagel, 1766)
Acronicta euphorbiae (Denis & Schiffermuller, 1775)
Acronicta menyanthidis (Esper, 1789)
Acronicta rumicis (Linnaeus, 1758)
Actinotia polyodon (Clerck, 1759)
Aedia funesta (Esper, 1786)
Aegle kaekeritziana (Hübner, 1799)
Agrochola lychnidis (Denis & Schiffermuller, 1775)
Agrochola helvola (Linnaeus, 1758)
Agrochola humilis (Denis & Schiffermuller, 1775)
Agrochola litura (Linnaeus, 1758)
Agrochola nitida (Denis & Schiffermuller, 1775)
Agrochola lota (Clerck, 1759)
Agrochola macilenta (Hübner, 1809)
Agrochola laevis (Hübner, 1803)
Agrochola circellaris (Hufnagel, 1766)
Agrotis bigramma (Esper, 1790)
Agrotis cinerea (Denis & Schiffermuller, 1775)
Agrotis clavis (Hufnagel, 1766)
Agrotis desertorum Boisduval, 1840
Agrotis exclamationis (Linnaeus, 1758)
Agrotis ipsilon (Hufnagel, 1766)
Agrotis obesa Boisduval, 1829
Agrotis segetum (Denis & Schiffermuller, 1775)
Agrotis trux (Hübner, 1824)
Allophyes oxyacanthae (Linnaeus, 1758)
Ammoconia caecimacula (Denis & Schiffermuller, 1775)
Amphipoea fucosa (Freyer, 1830)
Amphipoea oculea (Linnaeus, 1761)
Amphipyra berbera Rungs, 1949
Amphipyra livida (Denis & Schiffermuller, 1775)
Amphipyra perflua (Fabricius, 1787)
Amphipyra pyramidea (Linnaeus, 1758)
Amphipyra tetra (Fabricius, 1787)
Amphipyra tragopoginis (Clerck, 1759)
Anarta myrtilli (Linnaeus, 1761)
Anarta odontites (Boisduval, 1829)
Anarta stigmosa (Christoph, 1887)
Anarta trifolii (Hufnagel, 1766)
Anorthoa munda (Denis & Schiffermuller, 1775)
Antitype chi (Linnaeus, 1758)
Apamea anceps (Denis & Schiffermuller, 1775)
Apamea crenata (Hufnagel, 1766)
Apamea epomidion (Haworth, 1809)
Apamea furva (Denis & Schiffermuller, 1775)
Apamea illyria Freyer, 1846
Apamea lateritia (Hufnagel, 1766)
Apamea lithoxylaea (Denis & Schiffermuller, 1775)
Apamea monoglypha (Hufnagel, 1766)
Apamea oblonga (Haworth, 1809)
Apamea remissa (Hübner, 1809)
Apamea scolopacina (Esper, 1788)
Apamea sordens (Hufnagel, 1766)
Apamea sublustris (Esper, 1788)
Apamea unanimis (Hübner, 1813)
Aporophyla lutulenta (Denis & Schiffermuller, 1775)
Apterogenum ypsillon (Denis & Schiffermuller, 1775)
Asteroscopus sphinx (Hufnagel, 1766)
Atethmia ambusta (Denis & Schiffermuller, 1775)
Atethmia centrago (Haworth, 1809)
Athetis furvula (Hübner, 1808)
Athetis pallustris (Hübner, 1808)
Autographa bractea (Denis & Schiffermuller, 1775)
Autographa buraetica (Staudinger, 1892)
Autographa gamma (Linnaeus, 1758)
Autographa jota (Linnaeus, 1758)
Autographa pulchrina (Haworth, 1809)
Axylia putris (Linnaeus, 1761)
Brachionycha nubeculosa (Esper, 1785)
Brachylomia viminalis (Fabricius, 1776)
Bryophila orthogramma (Boursin, 1954)
Bryophila raptricula (Denis & Schiffermuller, 1775)
Bryophila ravula (Hübner, 1813)
Bryophila seladona Christoph, 1885
Bryophila domestica (Hufnagel, 1766)
Calamia tridens (Hufnagel, 1766)
Calophasia lunula (Hufnagel, 1766)
Calophasia platyptera (Esper, 1788)
Caradrina morpheus (Hufnagel, 1766)
Caradrina clavipalpis Scopoli, 1763
Cardepia hartigi Parenzan, 1981
Ceramica pisi (Linnaeus, 1758)
Cerapteryx graminis (Linnaeus, 1758)
Cerastis rubricosa (Denis & Schiffermuller, 1775)
Charanyca ferruginea (Esper, 1785)
Chersotis cuprea (Denis & Schiffermuller, 1775)
Chilodes maritima (Tauscher, 1806)
Chloantha hyperici (Denis & Schiffermuller, 1775)
Chrysodeixis chalcites (Esper, 1789)
Colocasia coryli (Linnaeus, 1758)
Conisania cervina (Eversmann, 1842)
Conisania leineri (Freyer, 1836)
Conisania luteago (Denis & Schiffermuller, 1775)
Conistra ligula (Esper, 1791)
Conistra rubiginosa (Scopoli, 1763)
Conistra vaccinii (Linnaeus, 1761)
Conistra veronicae (Hübner, 1813)
Conistra erythrocephala (Denis & Schiffermuller, 1775)
Conistra rubiginea (Denis & Schiffermuller, 1775)
Cosmia trapezina (Linnaeus, 1758)
Cosmia diffinis (Linnaeus, 1767)
Cosmia pyralina (Denis & Schiffermuller, 1775)
Cosmia affinis (Linnaeus, 1767)
Craniophora ligustri (Denis & Schiffermuller, 1775)
Craniophora pontica (Staudinger, 1878)
Cryphia fraudatricula (Hübner, 1803)
Cryphia receptricula (Hübner, 1803)
Cryphia algae (Fabricius, 1775)
Cucullia absinthii (Linnaeus, 1761)
Cucullia artemisiae (Hufnagel, 1766)
Cucullia asteris (Denis & Schiffermuller, 1775)
Cucullia biornata Fischer von Waldheim, 1840
Cucullia chamomillae (Denis & Schiffermuller, 1775)
Cucullia fraudatrix Eversmann, 1837
Cucullia lactucae (Denis & Schiffermuller, 1775)
Cucullia lucifuga (Denis & Schiffermuller, 1775)
Cucullia tanaceti (Denis & Schiffermuller, 1775)
Cucullia umbratica (Linnaeus, 1758)
Cucullia xeranthemi Boisduval, 1840
Cucullia lanceolata (Villers, 1789)
Cucullia lychnitis Rambur, 1833
Cucullia prenanthis Boisduval, 1840
Cucullia scrophulariae (Denis & Schiffermuller, 1775)
Cucullia verbasci (Linnaeus, 1758)
Deltote bankiana (Fabricius, 1775)
Deltote deceptoria (Scopoli, 1763)
Deltote uncula (Clerck, 1759)
Deltote pygarga (Hufnagel, 1766)
Diachrysia chrysitis (Linnaeus, 1758)
Diachrysia chryson (Esper, 1789)
Diachrysia stenochrysis (Warren, 1913)
Diachrysia zosimi (Hübner, 1822)
Diarsia brunnea (Denis & Schiffermuller, 1775)
Diarsia florida (F. Schmidt, 1859)
Diarsia mendica (Fabricius, 1775)
Diarsia rubi (Vieweg, 1790)
Dichagyris flammatra (Denis & Schiffermuller, 1775)
Dichagyris candelisequa (Denis & Schiffermuller, 1775)
Dichagyris forcipula (Denis & Schiffermuller, 1775)
Dichagyris renigera (Hübner, 1808)
Dichagyris signifera (Denis & Schiffermuller, 1775)
Dichonia convergens (Denis & Schiffermuller, 1775)
Dicycla oo (Linnaeus, 1758)
Diloba caeruleocephala (Linnaeus, 1758)
Dryobotodes eremita (Fabricius, 1775)
Egira conspicillaris (Linnaeus, 1758)
Elaphria venustula (Hübner, 1790)
Enargia paleacea (Esper, 1788)
Eogena contaminei (Eversmann, 1847)
Epilecta linogrisea (Denis & Schiffermuller, 1775)
Episema glaucina (Esper, 1789)
Episema korsakovi (Christoph, 1885)
Episema tersa (Denis & Schiffermuller, 1775)
Eremobia ochroleuca (Denis & Schiffermuller, 1775)
Eremohadena immunda (Eversmann, 1842)
Eugraphe sigma (Denis & Schiffermuller, 1775)
Euplexia lucipara (Linnaeus, 1758)
Eupsilia transversa (Hufnagel, 1766)
Euxoa aquilina (Denis & Schiffermuller, 1775)
Euxoa basigramma (Staudinger, 1870)
Euxoa diaphora Boursin, 1928
Euxoa distinguenda (Lederer, 1857)
Euxoa nigricans (Linnaeus, 1761)
Euxoa obelisca (Denis & Schiffermuller, 1775)
Euxoa ochrogaster (Guenee, 1852)
Euxoa vitta (Esper, 1789)
Globia algae (Esper, 1789)
Globia sparganii (Esper, 1790)
Graphiphora augur (Fabricius, 1775)
Griposia aprilina (Linnaeus, 1758)
Hada plebeja (Linnaeus, 1761)
Hadena irregularis (Hufnagel, 1766)
Hadena perplexa (Denis & Schiffermuller, 1775)
Hadena silenes (Hübner, 1822)
Hadena syriaca (Osthelder, 1933)
Hadena albimacula (Borkhausen, 1792)
Hadena compta (Denis & Schiffermuller, 1775)
Hadena confusa (Hufnagel, 1766)
Hadena filograna (Esper, 1788)
Hadena magnolii (Boisduval, 1829)
Hadena tephroleuca (Boisduval, 1833)
Hecatera bicolorata (Hufnagel, 1766)
Hecatera cappa (Hübner, 1809)
Hecatera dysodea (Denis & Schiffermuller, 1775)
Helicoverpa armigera (Hübner, 1808)
Heliothis adaucta Butler, 1878
Heliothis incarnata Freyer, 1838
Heliothis maritima Graslin, 1855
Heliothis peltigera (Denis & Schiffermuller, 1775)
Heliothis viriplaca (Hufnagel, 1766)
Helotropha leucostigma (Hübner, 1808)
Hillia iris (Zetterstedt, 1839)
Hoplodrina ambigua (Denis & Schiffermuller, 1775)
Hoplodrina blanda (Denis & Schiffermuller, 1775)
Hoplodrina octogenaria (Goeze, 1781)
Hydraecia micacea (Esper, 1789)
Ipimorpha retusa (Linnaeus, 1761)
Ipimorpha subtusa (Denis & Schiffermuller, 1775)
Jodia croceago (Denis & Schiffermuller, 1775)
Lacanobia contigua (Denis & Schiffermuller, 1775)
Lacanobia suasa (Denis & Schiffermuller, 1775)
Lacanobia thalassina (Hufnagel, 1766)
Lacanobia aliena (Hübner, 1809)
Lacanobia blenna (Hübner, 1824)
Lacanobia oleracea (Linnaeus, 1758)
Lacanobia praedita (Hübner, 1813)
Lacanobia splendens (Hübner, 1808)
Lacanobia w-latinum (Hufnagel, 1766)
Lasionycta proxima (Hübner, 1809)
Lateroligia ophiogramma (Esper, 1794)
Lenisa geminipuncta (Haworth, 1809)
Leucania comma (Linnaeus, 1761)
Leucania obsoleta (Hübner, 1803)
Leucania zeae (Duponchel, 1827)
Lithophane consocia (Borkhausen, 1792)
Lithophane furcifera (Hufnagel, 1766)
Lithophane lamda (Fabricius, 1787)
Lithophane ornitopus (Hufnagel, 1766)
Lithophane socia (Hufnagel, 1766)
Litoligia literosa (Haworth, 1809)
Luperina testacea (Denis & Schiffermuller, 1775)
Macdunnoughia confusa (Stephens, 1850)
Mamestra brassicae (Linnaeus, 1758)
Meganephria bimaculosa (Linnaeus, 1767)
Melanchra persicariae (Linnaeus, 1761)
Mesapamea secalis (Linnaeus, 1758)
Mesogona oxalina (Hübner, 1803)
Mesoligia furuncula (Denis & Schiffermuller, 1775)
Mniotype adusta (Esper, 1790)
Mniotype satura (Denis & Schiffermuller, 1775)
Moma alpium (Osbeck, 1778)
Mormo maura (Linnaeus, 1758)
Mycteroplus puniceago (Boisduval, 1840)
Mythimna albipuncta (Denis & Schiffermuller, 1775)
Mythimna ferrago (Fabricius, 1787)
Mythimna l-album (Linnaeus, 1767)
Mythimna conigera (Denis & Schiffermuller, 1775)
Mythimna impura (Hübner, 1808)
Mythimna pallens (Linnaeus, 1758)
Mythimna pudorina (Denis & Schiffermuller, 1775)
Mythimna straminea (Treitschke, 1825)
Mythimna turca (Linnaeus, 1761)
Mythimna vitellina (Hübner, 1808)
Mythimna unipuncta (Haworth, 1809)
Mythimna alopecuri (Boisduval, 1840)
Mythimna andereggii (Boisduval, 1840)
Mythimna sicula (Treitschke, 1835)
Naenia typica (Linnaeus, 1758)
Noctua comes Hübner, 1813
Noctua interposita (Hübner, 1790)
Noctua janthina Denis & Schiffermuller, 1775
Noctua orbona (Hufnagel, 1766)
Noctua pronuba (Linnaeus, 1758)
Nonagria typhae (Thunberg, 1784)
Nyctobrya muralis (Forster, 1771)
Ochropleura leucogaster (Freyer, 1831)
Ochropleura plecta (Linnaeus, 1761)
Oligia latruncula (Denis & Schiffermuller, 1775)
Oligia strigilis (Linnaeus, 1758)
Oligia versicolor (Borkhausen, 1792)
Omphalophana antirrhinii (Hübner, 1803)
Orbona fragariae Vieweg, 1790
Orthosia gracilis (Denis & Schiffermuller, 1775)
Orthosia opima (Hübner, 1809)
Orthosia cerasi (Fabricius, 1775)
Orthosia cruda (Denis & Schiffermuller, 1775)
Orthosia miniosa (Denis & Schiffermuller, 1775)
Orthosia populeti (Fabricius, 1775)
Orthosia incerta (Hufnagel, 1766)
Orthosia gothica (Linnaeus, 1758)
Oxicesta geographica (Fabricius, 1787)
Pachetra sagittigera (Hufnagel, 1766)
Panemeria tenebrata (Scopoli, 1763)
Panolis flammea (Denis & Schiffermuller, 1775)
Papestra biren (Goeze, 1781)
Parastichtis suspecta (Hübner, 1817)
Peridroma saucia (Hübner, 1808)
Periphanes delphinii (Linnaeus, 1758)
Phlogophora meticulosa (Linnaeus, 1758)
Phragmatiphila nexa (Hübner, 1808)
Phyllophila obliterata (Rambur, 1833)
Plusia festucae (Linnaeus, 1758)
Plusia putnami (Grote, 1873)
Polia bombycina (Hufnagel, 1766)
Polia hepatica (Clerck, 1759)
Polia nebulosa (Hufnagel, 1766)
Polychrysia moneta (Fabricius, 1787)
Polymixis polymita (Linnaeus, 1761)
Polyphaenis sericata (Esper, 1787)
Protoschinia scutosa (Denis & Schiffermuller, 1775)
Pseudeustrotia candidula (Denis & Schiffermuller, 1775)
Pyrrhia umbra (Hufnagel, 1766)
Rhizedra lutosa (Hübner, 1803)
Rhyacia simulans (Hufnagel, 1766)
Saragossa porosa (Eversmann, 1854)
Saragossa siccanorum (Staudinger, 1870)
Scotochrosta pulla (Denis & Schiffermuller, 1775)
Senta flammea (Curtis, 1828)
Sideridis rivularis (Fabricius, 1775)
Sideridis reticulata (Goeze, 1781)
Sideridis egena (Lederer, 1853)
Sideridis turbida (Esper, 1790)
Simyra albovenosa (Goeze, 1781)
Simyra dentinosa Freyer, 1838
Simyra nervosa (Denis & Schiffermuller, 1775)
Spaelotis ravida (Denis & Schiffermuller, 1775)
Spodoptera exigua (Hübner, 1808)
Subacronicta megacephala (Denis & Schiffermuller, 1775)
Thalpophila matura (Hufnagel, 1766)
Tholera cespitis (Denis & Schiffermuller, 1775)
Tholera decimalis (Poda, 1761)
Tiliacea aurago (Denis & Schiffermuller, 1775)
Tiliacea citrago (Linnaeus, 1758)
Tiliacea sulphurago (Denis & Schiffermuller, 1775)
Trachea atriplicis (Linnaeus, 1758)
Tyta luctuosa (Denis & Schiffermuller, 1775)
Ulochlaena hirta (Hübner, 1813)
Valeria oleagina (Denis & Schiffermuller, 1775)
Victrix umovii (Eversmann, 1846)
Xanthia gilvago (Denis & Schiffermuller, 1775)
Xanthia icteritia (Hufnagel, 1766)
Xanthia ocellaris (Borkhausen, 1792)
Xanthia castanea Osthelder, 1933
Xanthia togata (Esper, 1788)
Xestia c-nigrum (Linnaeus, 1758)
Xestia triangulum (Hufnagel, 1766)
Xestia baja (Denis & Schiffermuller, 1775)
Xestia stigmatica (Hübner, 1813)
Xestia xanthographa (Denis & Schiffermuller, 1775)
Xylena exsoleta (Linnaeus, 1758)
Xylena vetusta (Hübner, 1813)

Nolidae
Bena bicolorana (Fuessly, 1775)
Earias clorana (Linnaeus, 1761)
Earias vernana (Fabricius, 1787)
Meganola albula (Denis & Schiffermuller, 1775)
Meganola strigula (Denis & Schiffermuller, 1775)
Meganola togatulalis (Hübner, 1796)
Nola aerugula (Hübner, 1793)
Nola confusalis (Herrich-Schäffer, 1847)
Nola cucullatella (Linnaeus, 1758)
Nycteola asiatica (Krulikovsky, 1904)
Nycteola revayana (Scopoli, 1772)
Pseudoips prasinana (Linnaeus, 1758)

Notodontidae
Cerura vinula (Linnaeus, 1758)
Clostera curtula (Linnaeus, 1758)
Clostera pigra (Hufnagel, 1766)
Dicranura ulmi (Denis & Schiffermuller, 1775)
Gluphisia crenata (Esper, 1785)
Harpyia milhauseri (Fabricius, 1775)
Notodonta torva (Hübner, 1803)
Notodonta ziczac (Linnaeus, 1758)
Peridea anceps (Goeze, 1781)
Phalera bucephala (Linnaeus, 1758)
Pheosia tremula (Clerck, 1759)
Pterostoma palpina (Clerck, 1759)
Ptilodon capucina (Linnaeus, 1758)
Stauropus fagi (Linnaeus, 1758)
Thaumetopoea pinivora (Treitschke, 1834)
Thaumetopoea pityocampa (Denis & Schiffermuller, 1775)
Thaumetopoea processionea (Linnaeus, 1758)

Oecophoridae
Alabonia staintoniella (Zeller, 1850)
Bisigna procerella (Denis & Schiffermuller, 1775)
Endrosis sarcitrella (Linnaeus, 1758)
Epicallima formosella (Denis & Schiffermuller, 1775)
Harpella forficella (Scopoli, 1763)
Schiffermuelleria schaefferella (Linnaeus, 1758)

Pterophoridae
Emmelina monodactyla (Linnaeus, 1758)
Pterophorus pentadactyla (Linnaeus, 1758)

Pyralidae
Acrobasis glaucella Staudinger, 1859
Aphomia sociella (Linnaeus, 1758)
Aphomia zelleri de Joannis, 1932
Endotricha flammealis (Denis & Schiffermuller, 1775)
Ephestia unicolorella Staudinger, 1881
Epischnia prodromella (Hübner, 1799)
Hypsopygia costalis (Fabricius, 1775)
Hypsopygia glaucinalis (Linnaeus, 1758)
Isauria dilucidella (Duponchel, 1836)
Pyralis lienigialis (Zeller, 1843)
Pyralis regalis Denis & Schiffermuller, 1775
Salebriopsis albicilla (Herrich-Schäffer, 1849)
Synaphe moldavica (Esper, 1794)

Scythrididae
Scythris apicalis (Zeller, 1847)
Scythris bifissella (O. Hofmann, 1889)
Scythris cicadella (Zeller, 1839)
Scythris clavella (Zeller, 1855)
Scythris cuspidella (Denis & Schiffermuller, 1775)
Scythris disparella (Tengstrom, 1848)
Scythris flabella (Mann, 1861)
Scythris fuscoaenea (Haworth, 1828)
Scythris fuscopterella Bengtsson, 1977
Scythris inertella (Zeller, 1855)
Scythris laminella (Denis & Schiffermuller, 1775)
Scythris limbella (Fabricius, 1775)
Scythris palustris (Zeller, 1855)
Scythris picaepennis (Haworth, 1828)
Scythris podoliensis Rebel, 1938
Scythris productella (Zeller, 1839)
Scythris pudorinella (Moschler, 1866)
Scythris seliniella (Zeller, 1839)
Scythris setiella (Zeller, 1870)
Scythris sinensis (Felder & Rogenhofer, 1875)
Scythris subseliniella (Heinemann, 1876)

Sesiidae
Bembecia ichneumoniformis (Denis & Schiffermuller, 1775)
Chamaesphecia palustris Kautz, 1927
Paranthrene tabaniformis (Rottemburg, 1775)
Sesia apiformis (Clerck, 1759)
Synanthedon myopaeformis (Borkhausen, 1789)
Synanthedon tipuliformis (Clerck, 1759)
Synanthedon vespiformis (Linnaeus, 1761)

Sphingidae
Acherontia atropos (Linnaeus, 1758)
Agrius convolvuli (Linnaeus, 1758)
Deilephila elpenor (Linnaeus, 1758)
Deilephila porcellus (Linnaeus, 1758)
Dolbina elegans A. Bang-Haas, 1912
Hemaris tityus (Linnaeus, 1758)
Hyles euphorbiae (Linnaeus, 1758)
Hyles gallii (Rottemburg, 1775)
Hyles hippophaes (Esper, 1789)
Laothoe populi (Linnaeus, 1758)
Macroglossum stellatarum (Linnaeus, 1758)
Marumba quercus (Denis & Schiffermuller, 1775)
Mimas tiliae (Linnaeus, 1758)
Smerinthus ocellata (Linnaeus, 1758)
Sphinx ligustri Linnaeus, 1758

Thyrididae
Thyris fenestrella (Scopoli, 1763)

Tineidae
Nemapogon inconditella (Lucas, 1956)
Nemapogon nigralbella (Zeller, 1839)
Nemapogon ruricolella (Stainton, 1849)
Tenaga rhenania (Petersen, 1962)

Tischeriidae
Coptotriche angusticollella (Duponchel, 1843)

Tortricidae
Cydia pomonella (Linnaeus, 1758)
Grapholita fissana (Frolich, 1828)
Tortrix viridana Linnaeus, 1758

Zygaenidae
Adscita geryon (Hübner, 1813)
Adscita statices (Linnaeus, 1758)
Jordanita graeca (Jordan, 1907)
Jordanita subsolana (Staudinger, 1862)
Rhagades pruni (Denis & Schiffermuller, 1775)
Theresimima ampellophaga (Bayle-Barelle, 1808)
Zygaena carniolica (Scopoli, 1763)
Zygaena brizae (Esper, 1800)
Zygaena cynarae (Esper, 1789)
Zygaena laeta (Hübner, 1790)
Zygaena punctum Ochsenheimer, 1808
Zygaena purpuralis (Brunnich, 1763)
Zygaena angelicae Ochsenheimer, 1808
Zygaena ephialtes (Linnaeus, 1767)
Zygaena filipendulae (Linnaeus, 1758)
Zygaena lonicerae (Scheven, 1777)
Zygaena loti (Denis & Schiffermuller, 1775)
Zygaena osterodensis Reiss, 1921
Zygaena viciae (Denis & Schiffermuller, 1775)

References

External links
Fauna Europaea

Moldova
Moldova
Moldova
Moths
Lepidoptera